A list of films produced in the United Kingdom in 1972 (see 1972 in film):

1972

See also
1972 in British music
1972 in British radio
1972 in British television
1972 in the United Kingdom

References

External links
 

1972
Films
Lists of 1972 films by country or language